Golby is a surname. Notable people with the surname include:

Alexandra Golby, American neurosurgeon
Mitch Golby (born 1991), Australian rules footballer

See also
Colby (surname)